Kiiskinen is a Finnish surname. Notable people with the surname include:

 Aura Kiiskinen, Finnish politician
 Olli Kiiskinen, Finnish politician
 Heikki Kiiskinen, Finnish politician
 Jyrki Kiiskinen, Finnish writer
 Kalle Kiiskinen, Finnish curler
 Katja Kiiskinen (born 1983), Finnish curler and coach
 Tuomas Kiiskinen, Finnish ice hockey player 

Finnish-language surnames